Chafteh may refer to:
Chafteh, Kermanshah
Chafteh, Yazd

See also
Chafteh Darreh (disambiguation)